Enteromius ditinensis is a species of ray-finned fish in the genus Enteromius, which is found in the upper basin of the Senegal River in Guinea.

References

 

Enteromius
Taxa named by Jacques Daget
Fish described in 1962